Carlton Johnson (born October 13, 1969) is a former American football defensive back who played four seasons in the Arena Football League with the Las Vegas Sting, Anaheim Piranhas and Albany Firebirds. He played college football at the University of Nevada, Las Vegas. He was also a member of the Shreveport Pirates of the Canadian Football League.

References

External links
Just Sports Stats

Living people
1969 births
Players of American football from Nevada
American football defensive backs
African-American players of American football
UNLV Rebels football players
Las Vegas Sting players
Shreveport Pirates players
Anaheim Piranhas players
Albany Firebirds players
Sportspeople from Las Vegas
21st-century African-American people
20th-century African-American sportspeople